Creole Rock (in French, Rocher Créole) is a small island in the Caribbean Sea off the coast of the island of Saint Martin, and is administered as part of the French overseas collectivity of Saint Martin. It is part of the National nature reserve of Saint-Martin.

There is a reef off the coast of the rock and plenty of fish. It is a popular diving and snorkeling destination, with its shallow water and sandy bottom. Although it is forbidden to climb the rock itself, boats are allowed in the vicinity as long as they use the moorings.

See also
List of Caribbean islands

References

Windward Islands
Geography of the Collectivity of Saint Martin
Islands of the Collectivity of Saint Martin